Bhutta College of Engineering and Technology is a college that was established in 2003 in the state of Punjab, India.

External links
http://www.bcetldh.org/

Engineering colleges in Punjab, India
Education in Ludhiana
Science and technology in Ludhiana
2003 establishments in Punjab, India
Educational institutions established in 2003